Chansi V. Stuckey (born October 4, 1983) is an American football coach and former wide receiver. He is currently the Wide Receivers Coach at Notre Dame. He was drafted by the New York Jets in the seventh round of the 2007 NFL Draft. He played college football at Clemson. Stuckey also played for the Cleveland Browns and the Arizona Cardinals.

Professional career

New York Jets
Stuckey was drafted in the seventh round (235th overall) of the 2007 NFL Draft by the New York Jets. After a promising preseason performance with 11 receptions, he sat out the entire 2007 regular season due to a broken foot. He started at the wide receiver position for the Jets in 2008. In each of the Jets' first three games, he caught touchdown passes from quarterback Brett Favre. Stuckey also caught Mark Sanchez's first career NFL touchdown against the Houston Texans in Week 1 of the 2009 NFL season.

Cleveland Browns
On October 7, 2009, Stuckey was traded to the Cleveland Browns, along with Jason Trusnik, and third and fifth round draft picks in the 2010 NFL Draft. The Jets received Braylon Edwards.

Arizona Cardinals
Stuckey was signed by the Arizona Cardinals on July 29, 2011. He was released on March 16, 2012.

Toronto Argonauts
On October 17, 2012, Stuckey was signed by the Toronto Argonauts of the Canadian Football League.  He was released by the team on November 10, 2012.

Coaching career
After his playing career ended, Stuckey was named a video graduate assistant at his alma mater Clemson in 2019. He was promoted to an offensive player development coach in 2020.

Stuckey was named the wide receivers coach at Baylor on January 5, 2021.

Stuckey was named the wide receivers coach at Notre Dame on January 12, 2022.

References

External links
Clemson profile

1983 births
Living people
People from Warner Robins, Georgia
Players of American football from Georgia (U.S. state)
American football wide receivers
Canadian football wide receivers
American players of Canadian football
Clemson Tigers football players
New York Jets players
Cleveland Browns players
Arizona Cardinals players
Toronto Argonauts players
Clemson Tigers football coaches
Baylor Bears football coaches